Edmund Allen (or Edmond, or Alen, or Edmonde Aellen; c. 1519 – 1559) was an English clergyman and scholar.

A native of Norfolk, England, Allen was elected fellow of Corpus Christi College, Cambridge in 1536. He became steward of Corpus in 1539, and not long after obtained leave of the society to go and study abroad. He became, according to John Strype, a great proficient in the Ancient Greek and Latin tongues, an eminent divine, and a learned minister of the gospel. He was in exile during the reign of Mary I; but Elizabeth I, on coming to the crown, appointed him one of her chaplains, gave him a commission to act under her as an ambassador, and promoted him to the see of Rochester, which however he did not live to fill. It is said he was buried in the church of St. Thomas Apostle, in London, 30 August 1559.

He translated into English De Authoritate Verbi Dei by Alexander Ales and in 1543 works of Philip Melanchthon while he was abroad. He also wrote A Christian Introduction for Youth.

References

Latin–English translators
1510s births
1559 deaths
People from Norfolk
Fellows of Corpus Christi College, Cambridge
English chaplains
16th-century English translators
Bishops of Rochester
History of Kent
16th-century English bishops
People of the Tudor period
16th-century English diplomats